Avalanche is an EP that was released in October 2000 by Echo & the Bunnymen. The EP was released on CD by Gimme Music and was only available to buy on the internet.

Overview
The first track on the original EP is a cover version of American folk musician Tim Hardin's song "How Can We Hang On to a Dream?", with the title changed to "Hang on to a Dream". The second track, "Avalanche", was a new song by the band. The next three tracks ("All My Colours (Zimbo)", "Silver" and "Angels and Devils") are re-recordings of songs previously released by the band. The final track of the original EP is a cover of the Bob Dylan song "It's All Over Now, Baby Blue" with the title listed as "It's All Over Now".

In 2003 the EP was re-released with two bonus tracks: the first being the Electrafixion version of "Baseball Bill" and the second being a remixed version called "Baseball Bill (Sgt Fuzz Remix)".

Track listing

Original release
"Hang on to a Dream" (Tim Hardin) – 2:26
"Avalanche" (Will Sergeant, Ian McCulloch) – 3:27
"All My Colours (Zimbo)" (Sergeant, McCulloch, Les Pattinson, Pete de Freitas) – 4:12
"Silver" (Sergeant, McCulloch, Pattinson, de Freitas) – 3:18
"Angels and Devils" (Sergeant, McCulloch, Pattinson, de Freitas) – 3:31
"It's All Over Now (Baby Blue)" (Bob Dylan) – 3:35

2003 reissue
"Baseball Bill (Electrafixion Version)" (Sergeant, McCulloch) – 4:43
"Baseball Bill (Sgt Fuzz Remix)" (Sergeant, McCulloch) – 4:35

Personnel

Musicians
Ian McCulloch – vocals, guitar
Will Sergeant – lead guitar
Alex Gleave – bass
Ceri James – keyboards
Vinnie Jamieson – drums

Production
Ian McCulloch – producer
Will Sergeant – producer
Tim Speed – engineer
Nick Allen – sleeve artwork

References

2000 EPs
Echo & the Bunnymen EPs